Wilmer-Hutchins High School (nicknamed "The Hutch") is a public secondary school in Dallas, Texas (USA). A part of the Dallas Independent School District, Wilmer-Hutchins High was formerly part of the now defunct Wilmer-Hutchins Independent School District.

Located at 5520 Langdon Road in far south Dallas, the 9-12 campus serves portions of Dallas, most of Hutchins, Wilmer, a small portion of Lancaster, as well as unincorporated areas in southeastern Dallas County.

History

Wilmer-Hutchins High School was originally established in 1928, after four smaller school districts consolidated.  A new $60,000 campus was built on Highway 75, midway between Wilmer and Hutchins.  The building was expanded in the 1950s with the addition of a large gymnasium and an annex housing a junior high school.

The district's population grew rapidly in the 1950s and 1960s as hundreds of black families moved into new home developments located in the Dallas portion of the district.  However, none of their children attended WHHS, as it was designated a "whites only" school. Black high school students were bused to Dallas' Lincoln High School until 1964, when Wilmer-Hutchins opened John F. Kennedy High School and Milton K. Curry Junior High School in the northern portion of the district.

The school district was forced by courts to integrate in 1968.  Kennedy High School was closed after only four years (it was combined with its sister campus to form Kennedy-Curry Junior High School) and all high school students attended WHHS.  White families began fleeing the district, and by 1972 the school's population was almost 100 percent black.

In 1983, a new campus was built on Langdon Road in Dallas, north of Hutchins and closer to most of the student body.  The old campus became C.S. Winn Junior High School, which was later used as an elementary school before being abandoned in the early 2000s.

The school won the 1990 Class AAAA state football championship.

From 1991 to 1996 the school had six different principals. In August 1995 the school district hired 60 new teachers for the school. By October 1996, 20 of those teachers hired remained.

In 2004 the school closed since a rainstorm damaged the roof and the district was unable to get the problem fixed in a timely manner. Mark Dent of The Dallas Morning News wrote that WHISD's "inability to pay for repairs exposed its financial deficits and ineptitude." In 2004 the WHISD school board voted to close Wilmer Hutchins High School. Students were moved January 2005. In 2005 WHISD closed. The Dallas Independent School District (DISD) took over WHISD's boundary. Wilmer-Hutchins High School closed, and the entire senior class of Wilmer-Hutchins High School attended South Oak Cliff High School. Ron Price, a member of the DISD board of trustees, preferred that the seniors attended Madison High School, but the WHISD seniors preferred South Oak Cliff since it was closer to their residences. In a telephone survey most seniors said that they would prefer staying together in one school rather than being divided across many schools based on the locations of their residences. The other high school classes were divided between South Oak Cliff, David W. Carter High School, A. Maceo Smith High School, and Franklin D. Roosevelt High School. The high school stayed closed for six years. When DISD took over WHISD schools in 2005, DISD was unable to use bond funds to renovate Wilmer Hutchins High, and would have had to have used its own general operating budget to do so.

DISD planned to convert the former Wilmer Hutchins campus into a magnet school. In 2008 police, acting on a tip, entered the closed school building and found plants which they believed to be marijuana plants in a classroom.

At the time of the district's closure, the WHHS campus (then only 22 years old) was in extreme disrepair. DISD heavily remodeled the WHHS campus, using funds from a $1.35 billion bond. The district completely renovated the auditorium, the career education building, and the interior. The school district enclosed the plaza entrance and added air conditioning and geothermal heating systems.

Six years after WHISD closed, the school re-opened as a Dallas ISD school in 2011. It absorbed students from A. Maceo Smith, which became a technology magnet school in fall of 2011. The majority of remaining students from Smith went to Wilmer-Hutchins. In addition to taking territory from Smith, WH High School also took territory from Carter, Roosevelt, and South Oak Cliff.

In April 2012 Marion Brooks, the principal, said that children zoned to 22 other schools, including some schools not within DISD, are attending Wilmer-Hutchins Schools.

Extracurricular activities

Football 

Wilmer-Hutchins has made 20 football playoff appearances, winning the 1990 Class AAAA State Football Championship by defeating Austin Westlake 19-7 at Floyd Casey Stadium in Waco, Texas on a bitterly cold day with temperatures in the teens and a sub-zero windchill. 

Following the 2000 UIL realignment that moved Wilmer-Hutchins from Class AAAA to Class AAA, the Eagles were one of the dominant Class AAA teams in the state for five years until Wilmer-Hutchins ISD ceased operations. 

When in 2011, a newly constructed Wilmer-Hutchins High School campus opened as part of the Dallas Independent School District, a majority of the football team members from A. Maceo Smith High School transferred to Wilmer-Hutchins and helped reestablish the Eagle football program.

The first home game for the new Eagle football team was on August 26, 2011 against the Moisés E. Molina High School Jaguars.

Band 
The Wilmer Hutchins Band is also known as the "Marching Music Machine".

School enrollment (1988-2005, 2019-present)

The ethnic composition of students in the 2019-2020 school year was 56% African American, 40% Hispanic, 2% White, and 2% others, including Asian and Multiracial. Of the 914 students, 675 (74%) were considered economically disadvantaged, 123 (14%) were considered special needs, 55 (6%) were enrolled in gifted and talented programs, and 238 (26%) were limited English proficiency.https://schools.texastribune.org/districts/dallas-isd/wilmer-hutchins-high-school/

Student performance
Wilmer-Hutchins High Schools's performance on the Texas Assessment of Academic Skills (TAAS), a state standardized test used from 1991 to 2003, was generally at or below state standards. The school received the rating of "acceptable" on six occasions (1993–94, 1995–96, 1997–98, 2000–01, 2001–02, and 2002–03) and the state's worst rating of "low performing" four times (1994–95, 1996–97, 1998–99, and 1999-00).

A new standardized test, the Texas Assessment of Knowledge and Skills (TAKS) was introduced in 2003. WHHS received a rating of "academically acceptable" for the 2003-04 school year and "academically unacceptable" for the 2004-05 school year. This was due to lower than acceptable passing rates on the test in Reading ("All Students" category and 1 of 3 analyzed subgroups) and Mathematics ("All Students" and all 3 analyzed subgroups).

Notable alumni

 Royce West is a Democratic African American member of the Texas Senate.
 Spud Webb is a retired NBA basketball point guard.
 Ricky Grace is a former NBL player
 Rickey Dixon is a former NFL football Safety.
 Keith LeMon Washington is a former NFL football defensive end.

References

Further reading
Izaguirre, Cynthia. "Wilmer-Hutchins H.S. principal talks about schools opening ." WFAA. Updated Tuesday August 21, 2011. Article date: August 22, 2011.

External links

 
 Wilmer-Hutchins Athletics
 Archive of the Wilmer-Hutchins ISD site
 Articles about the school at The Dallas Morning News

Dallas Independent School District high schools
Public high schools in Dallas
Educational institutions established in 1928
1928 establishments in Texas